Kathleen Korth (born 2 December 1952) is an American film editor. As first assistant editor she has worked on E.T.: The Extra-Terrestrial. As a re-snyc editor she worked on Terminator 2: Judgment Day. She has worked on feature films as well as films that were made for television.

Career
In the mid 1970s she worked on the Anthony Howarth directed documentary People of the Wind, which was about a tribe of nomads in west Iran. It also featured singer Shusha Guppy.<ref>Companion Encyclopedia of Middle Eastern and North African Film edited by Oliver Leaman [https://books.google.com/books?id=LmSFAgAAQBAJ&dq=Anthony+Howarth+People+of+the+Wind&pg=PA215 Page 215 Iranian Cinema]</ref>

In the late 1990s, she was the editor for the 1999 Laurel Ladevich directed documentary Fly Girls, which was about female pilots during the second world war.Jesamine County Public Library American experience, Fly girls, written, produced and directed by Laurel Ladevich Both Ladevich and North had previously worked together as editors in Eye on the Sparrow in 1987 and Blue Bayou in 1990.

Filmography
Editor
Films
 Eye on the Sparrow (1987)
 Blue Bayou (1990)
 Legacy(1990)
 The Secret (1992)
 Witness (1997)
Documentary
 The Wild West (1993)
 Yellowstone (1994)
 Ozarks: Legacy & Legend (1995)
 San Francisco: The Movie (1995)
 Zion Canyon: Treasure of the Gods (1996)
 Africa's Elephant Kingdom (1998)
 American Experience:Fly Girls (1999)

Sound dept
Sound editor
 Wow!Assistant sound editor
 Ordinary People (1980)
 Indiana Jones and the Temple of Doom (1984)
 Cocoon (1985)
 Soapdish (1991)
 House of Cards'' (1993)

References

External links
 

1952 births
Living people
American film editors